This is a list of the episodes of the anime television series Princess Resurrection.

Episode list

OVA trilogy
Although not televised, three subsequent anime OVAs were released from 9 December 2010 to 7 October 2011 with the 13th, 14th and 16th volumes of the manga compilations.

Commentary 

Every episode got the word "princess".

See also
List of Princess Resurrection characters

References

External links 
 

Princess Resurrection